Hawir al-Salib is a Syrian village located in the Subdistrict of the Hama District in the Hama Governorate. According to the Syria Central Bureau of Statistics (CBS), Hawir al-Salib had a population of 970 in the 2004 census. Its inhabitants are predominantly Alawites.

References

Bibliography

 

Populated places in Hama District
Alawite communities in Syria